Yelena Samarina (16 December 1927 – 4 May 2011) was a Russian-born actress who settled in Spain. She was originally selected to play the lead in Wim Wenders' historical The Scarlet Letter (1973), but the film's financial backers insisted on the casting of the better-known Senta Berger.

Selected filmography
 Cuéntame (2004)
 Antivicio (2001)
 La duquesa roja (1997)
 Don Juan in Hell (1991) 
 The Tunnel (1988)
 Lulú de noche (1986)
 Coarse Salt (1984)
 Cervantes (1981)
 Madrid al desnudo (1979)
 Trout (1978)
 La Carmen (1976)
 Gone to the Mountain (1974)
 The Man in Hiding (1971)
 Spaniards in Paris (1971)
 The House of 1,000 Dolls (1967)
 Currito of the Cross (1965)
 The Blackmailers (1963)
 The Balcony of the Moon (1962)
 Let's Make the Impossible! (1958)

References

Bibliography
  R. Barton Palmer. Nineteenth-Century American Fiction on Screen. Cambridge University Press, 2007.

External links

1933 births
2011 deaths
Russian film actresses
Russian television actresses
Spanish film actresses
Spanish television actresses
Actors from Omsk
Russian expatriates in Spain
Soviet expatriates in Spain